Vikaspedia is an online information guide launched by the Government of India. The website was implemented by C-DAC Hyderabad and is run by the Department of Electronics and Information Technology, Ministry of Communications and Information Technology.  It is built as a portal for the social sectors, and offers information in 23 languages: English, Assamese, Telugu, Hindi, Bengali, Gujarati, Kannada, Malayalam, Tamil, Bodo, Dogri, Sanskrit, Kashmiri, Konkani, Nepali, Odia, Urdu, Maithili, Meitei, Santali, Sindhi, Punjabi, and Marathi.

It was started on 18 February 2014 and has information in the domains of Agriculture, Health, Education, Social Welfare, Energy and e-Governance. The name of the portal is a portmanteau of the words Vikas (Sanskrit for "Development") and encyclopedia. The portal provides information in local languages in all six given sectors.

References

External links
 Official website

Government services web portals in India
Ministry of Communications and Information Technology (India)
Multilingual websites
2014 establishments in India
Meitei-language websites
Meitei language encyclopedias
Tamil-language websites
Tamil language encyclopedias
Telugu-language websites
Indian encyclopedias